The Criollo (in Spanish), or Crioulo (in Portuguese), is the native horse of the Pampas (a natural region between Uruguay, Argentina, Brazil, and Paraguay, in South America) with a reputation for long-distance endurance linked to a low basal metabolism. The breed, known for its hardiness and stamina, is popular in its home countries.

The word / originally referred to human and animals of pure-bred Spanish ancestry who were born in the Americas, or to animals or slaves born in the Americas. In time, the meaning of the word would simply come to refer to native breeds of the Americas.

Breed characteristics

The Criollo is a hardy horse with a brawny and strong body with broad chest and well-sprung ribs. They have sloping strong shoulders with muscular necks, short and strong legs with good bone structure and resistant joints, low-set hocks, and sound hard feet. The medium to large size long-muzzled head has a straight or slightly convex profile with wide-set eyes. The croup is sloping, the haunches well-muscled, and the back, short with a strong loin.

The criollo is tractable, intelligent, willing, and sensible. Criollo horses average 14.3 hands (149 cm) high, being the maximum height for stallions and geldings of 14 to 15 hands (142-152 cm) high. The difference between the maximum and minimum height for mares is approximately 2 cm (one inch). The line-backed dun is the most popular color, but the breed may also come in bay, brown, black, chestnut, grullo, buckskin, palomino, blue or strawberry roan, gray and overo colors.

The breed is famous for its endurance capabilities and ability to live in harsh conditions, as their homeland has both extreme heat and cold weather. They are frugal eaters, thriving on little grass. They have good disease resistance and are long-lived horses.

Breed history
The breed dates back to a 1535 shipment of 100 purebred Spaniards – Andalusian stallions coming from Cadiz, Spain, to the Rio de la Plata imported by the founder of Buenos Aires, Pedro de Mendoza.

In 1540, the hostility of the native populace forced the Spaniards to abandon Buenos Aires and release 12 to 45 horses. When Buenos Aires was resettled in 1580, it is estimated that the feral horse population numbered around 12,000. Since they largely reproduced in the wild, the criollo developed into an extremely hardy horse capable of surviving the extreme heat and cold, subsisting with little water, and living off the dry grasses of the area. Settlers later came and started capturing horses for riding and use as pack animals. The Native Americans had already been doing that many years before.
 

Throughout the 19th century, a large proportion of the horses were crossed with imported European Thoroughbred, coach, and draft horse stallions, and a larger, coarser, long-striding multi-purpose, saddle-cart horse resulted. However, the crossbreeding nearly ruined the native Spanish horse type. In 1918, the Argentine breeders decided to create a purebred criollo registry, and the breeders' association was then formed in 1923. Much infighting occurred between Emilio Solanet and Enrique Crotto's groups. The first promoted the Asian-type crioulo and the latter the taller African type with a coarse, convex head; fallen croup; and thinner mane and tail.

It was not until 1934 that Dr. Solanet was able to firmly take control of the breeders association. He set a new goal for the breed with a shorter, more compact stock horse which emulated the Chilean Horse breed that he admired so much. In 1938, 70% of the registered crioulos were culled because they did not possess the phenotype desired by Dr. Solanet and his followers. The new breed standard, about which he had written in 1928, was finally made available to the public once he was assured that the breeders were more united in their breed objectives. It would not be until 1957 that the registry was closed for Argentine native breeds, but the registry has remained open for the Chilean Horse breed that has been so influential in giving shape to the crioulo as a better stock horse. Nevertheless, the breed maintains its own identity in a taller, leggier and squarer body conformation with a more angular hock that gives it the long stride it requires to cover the great distances in the flat Argentine plains known as "Pampas". The modern crioulo head has a straight facial profile and a shorter muzzle with longer ears than is typical in the Chilean Horse breed.

Endurance
The breeders implemented rigorous endurance tests to help evaluate horses for breeding. No supplemental feed is allowed. The horses are required to carry heavy loads of 245 lb (110 kg) on their backs and may only eat the grass at the side of the road. At the end of the day, a veterinarian checks the horses.

Today, the horse is used mainly as a working cow horse, but it is also considered a pleasure and trail horse which contributed a great deal to the Argentine polo pony They are also excellent rodeo and endurance horses. It is an amazing demonstration of control that can literally pick up a steer and place it wherever it needs to be.

One example of the breed's fantastic endurance was the ride made by the Swiss-born Argentine rider Professor Aimé Félix Tschiffely (1894–1954) between 1925 and 1928. Tschiffely took two crioulos, 16-year-old Mancha and 15-year-old Gato, on a  trek from Buenos Aires to Manhattan, New York, crossing snow-capped mountains, the world's driest desert, the thickest tropical jungles, riding in all types of weather. Alternating the riding and packing between the two horses, the trio took three years to finish the trip. Tschiffely went through many hardships on the trip, including a bout of malaria, from the Pampas across La Quiaca, from La Paz, to Cuzco, Lima, Trujillo, Quito, Medellin and Cartagena. The horses did well in a wide array of extreme topographies and climates. Gato lived to be 36 and Mancha 40.

In 1987, Jorge Saenz Rosas, owner of the Argentine , offered his criollo Sufridor to the American Louis Bruhnke and the Russian-French Vladimir Fissenko for a horseback ride from the Beagle Channel in Tierra del Fuego up to the shores of the Arctic Ocean in Deadhorse, Alaska. After traveling for five and a half years, the ride was accomplished in the summer of 1993. Having made the entire journey, the Criollo Sufridor is likely the horse that has traveled the farthest in a single direction. The ride was chronicled in the book Sufridor, Emece (2000), written by Louis Bruhnke.

Notes

Footnotes

See also 
 Gaucho
 Gaucho sheepdog
 Pampas

References
 Aimé-Félix Tschiffely, Le Grand Raid - A Cheval De Buenos Aires À New York (1925–1928), Belin, coll. « Les cavaliers de l'aventure », 6 November 2002, 269 p.

External links

 Asociación Criadores de Caballos Criollos de Argentina
 Associação Brasileira dos Criadores de Cavalos Crioulos do Brasil
 Alemania: Caballos CRIOLLOS - Faszinierende Pferde aus Südamerika
 Associazione italiana cavallo criollo
 Criollo Breeder Society Uruguay

Horse breeds
Horse breeds originating in Argentina
Horse breeds originating in Brazil